

The Amalgamated Union of Foundry Workers (AUFW) was a trade union representing workers in foundries in the United Kingdom.

The union was founded in 1946 with the merger of the National Union of Foundry Workers, the Ironfounding Workers' Association and the United Metal Founders' Society.  In 1962, the North of England Brass, Aluminium, Bronze and Kindred Alloys Moulders' Trade and Friendly Society merged into the AUF, and the Amalgamated Moulders and Kindred Industries Trades Union joined in 1967.  Later that year, the union merged with the Amalgamated Engineering Union to form the Amalgamated Union of Engineering and Foundry Workers, acting as the foundry section of the new union.  At this point, the union had around 72,000 members.

Election results
The union sponsored Roland Casasola as a Labour Party candidate in two Parliamentary elections.

Leadership

General Secretaries
1946: Jim Gardner
1958: Tommy Graham
1960: David Lambert

Presidents
1946: Bill Wallace
1947: Archibald MacDougall
1954: Roland Casasola
1958: Fred Hollingsworth

Assistant General Secretaries
1946: Tom Colvin
1958: Tommy Graham
1958: David Lambert
1960:

Further reading
Hubert Jim Fyrth and Henry Collins, The Foundry Workers: a trade union history

References

External links
Catalogue of the AUFW archives, held at the Modern Records Centre, University of Warwick

Trade unions established in 1946
Trade unions disestablished in 1967
Foundry workers' trade unions
Trade unions based in Greater Manchester